Elections were held on 19 March 1977 to elect members to the fifth Niyamasabha. The United Front, led by INC and CPI won plurality of seats and remained in power, with K. Karunakaran as the Chief Minister.

History
Fourth Kerala Legislative Assembly, which was elected in 1970, completed its term by 1975, but it was extended on three occasions during the Emergency. Election of 1977 was the general election after the withdrawal of Emergency imposed on 26 June 1975.

This is the first election the 1974 delimitation of Assembly Constituencies was put to effect, which increased number of seat in the assembly from 133 to 140

Results

Party Wise Results

Constituency Wise Results

Formation of  Ministry  
On 25 March, K. Karunakaran of Congress sworn as Chief Minister. However, Karunakaran had to resign within a month over the controversial death of Left-leaning engineering student Rajan, who was tortured during the Emergency when he was the Home Minister. Then 15 member ministry under the leadership of A.K. Antony assumed office on 27 April 1977. When Congress split in January 1978, Karunakaran joined the new Indira Congress, and A K Antony continued with the 'main' Congress, which was variously known as Congress (Urs), Congress (Socialist). Antony resigned as Chief Minister in late 1978 when his Congress faction decided to support Indira Gandhi in Chickmagalur bye-election. CPI and Congress also drifted apart. Though the ruling alliance had won nearly 80% seats in the election, it became unstable, and the assembly lasted less than 3 years.  

K. Karunakaran's ministry holds the record for ministry which served the shortest term

References

External links 
 Kerala Assembly Election DATABASE

State Assembly elections in Kerala
1970s in Kerala
Kerala